Yevgeny Kafelnikov and David Rikl were the defending champions, but none competed this year.

Cyril Suk and Daniel Vacek won the title by defeating Jan Apell and Jonas Björkman 6–3, 6–4 in the final.

Seeds

Draw

Finals

Top half

Bottom half

References

External links
 Official results archive (ATP)
 Official results archive (ITF)

Men's Doubles